is a mountain located in Shikotsu-Toya National Park in Hokkaidō, Japan. It sits on the shore of Lake Shikotsu, a caldera lake. It also hosts a radio relay station.

Climbing Route
There is a road from Lake Shikotsu shore to the top of the mountain.

References

 Paul Hunt, Hiking in Japan: An Adventurer's Guide to the Mountain Trails, Tokyo, Kodansha International Ltd., 1988.  and  C0075

External links 

 Geographical Survey Institute

Morappu
Shikotsu-Tōya National Park